Todos Santos ("All Saints") is a small coastal town in the foothills of Mexico's Sierra de la Laguna Mountains, on the Pacific coast side of the Baja California Peninsula, about an hour's drive north of Cabo San Lucas on Highway 19 and an hour's drive southwest from La Paz. Todos Santos is located near the Tropic of Cancer in the municipality of La Paz. The population was 6,485 at the census of 2015. It is the second-largest town in the municipality.

History
The mission at what is now Todos Santos, Misión Santa Rosa de las Palmas, was founded by father Jaime Bravo in 1723.  In 1724, it was renamed Nuestra Señora del Pilar de La Paz.  Located across the street to the southwest from the small town plaza, this mission contains the statue of the Virgin of Pilar, which is the focus of Todos Santos's main festival in November.

During the Mexican American War, the Skirmish of Todos Santos, the last battle of the war, was fought near the town on March 30, 1848.

During the 19th century, following the secularization of the missions, Todos Santos thrived as the Baja sugarcane capital, supporting eight sugar mills at the end of the 19th century. Only one existed by the time the town’s freshwater spring dried up in 1950, and that last mill closed in 1965.

Todos Santos faced a bleak future until the spring came back to life in 1981 and the Mexican Government paved Highway 19 in the mid-1980s.  The highway brought tourists and the rich farmlands have been revived.  The town now prospers from farming vegetables, chilies, avocados, papayas and mangoes, as well as from fishing and ranching.

Contemporary Todos Santos

More recently, there has been a gradual increase in tourist activity and a boom in real estate development. Handicraft shops, owner-operated art galleries featuring landscape paintings of local scenes (some artists from Guadalajara and other parts of Mexico also exhibit works in Todos Santos), upscale restaurants, boutique hotels and restored colonial buildings have contributed to the gentrification and redevelopment of the town.  There are a few annual festivals, including the Festival de Cine and the Todos Santos Music Festival.

The Hotel California is a favorite stop because of the name association with the song made famous by the Eagles, even though the song does not specifically reference this particular hotel, nor any other existing hotel. On May 1, 2017, the Eagles band filed a lawsuit against the Hotel California in the United States District Court for the District of Central California alleging Trademark Infringement in Violation of the Lanham Act, 15 U.S.C. § 1125 and Common Law Unfair Competition and Trademark Infringement. The Eagles were seeking relief and damages. The lawsuit was settled in 2018: the hotel continues to use the name, abandoned efforts to apply for a trademark in the United States, and now expressly denies any connection with the song or the band.

Todos Santos, Baja California Sur, was named a "Pueblo Mágico" in 2006.

Notable residents
Félix Agramont Cota, first Governor of Baja California Sur
Peter Buck, musician

References

Sources
 ElCalendariodeTodosSantos.com Todos Santos' only English language magazine - full issues online.
 2010 census tables: INEGI: Instituto Nacional de Estadística, Geografía e Informática

Populated places in Baja California Sur
Pueblos Mágicos
La Paz Municipality (Baja California Sur)